Frances Fitzgerald (born 1 August 1950) is an Irish politician who has been a Member of the European Parliament (MEP) from Ireland for the Dublin constituency since July 2019. She is a member of Fine Gael, part of the European People's Party. She previously served as Tánaiste from 2016 to 2017, 
Minister for Business, Enterprise and Innovation from June 2017 to November 2017, Minister for Justice and Equality from 2014 to 2016, Minister for Children and Youth Affairs from 2011 to 2014 and Leader of Fine Gael in the Seanad from 2007 to 2011. She served as a Teachta Dála (TD) from 1992 to 2002 and 2011 to 2019. She was also a Senator for the Labour Panel from 2007 to 2011.  

She was the second Fine Gael politician to ever hold the office of Tánaiste, after Peter Barry in 1987.

Early and personal life
Born Frances Ryan, in Croom, County Limerick, she was educated at the Holy Family Secondary School Newbridge, the Dominican College Sion Hill, University College Dublin and the London School of Economics, where she studied a Masters in Social Administration and Social Work. She is a former social worker.

She is married to Professor of Psychiatry Michael Fitzgerald, with whom she has three sons.

Political career
Fitzgerald was first elected to Dáil Éireann as a Fine Gael TD for the Dublin South-East constituency, at the 1992 general election. She retained her seat at the 1997 general election. She lost her seat at the 2002 general election. She then stood for election to the 22nd Seanad, for the Administrative Panel, but was unsuccessful.

At the 1999 local elections, she was elected as a member of Dublin City Council for the Rathmines local electoral area, she sought to contest the 2004 local elections for the Rathmines ward but was not selected at the convention, losing out to Edie Wynne and Brian Gillen. She was not subsequently added to the ticket.

Before being elected a TD, she had been a high-profile Chair of the Council for the Status of Women from 1988 to 1992.

She was the Fine Gael candidate at the 2007 general election for the Dublin Mid-West constituency, but was not elected. She was elected to the Seanad in July 2007. On 12 September 2007, she was appointed leader of the Fine Gael group in Seanad Éireann, and was also Fine Gael Seanad Spokesperson on Health and Children, and a member of the Fine Gael Front Bench.

Minister for Children and Youth Affairs (2011–2014)
She was elected as a Fine Gael TD for the Dublin Mid-West constituency at the 2011 and 2016 general elections. On 9 March 2011, she was appointed as Minister for Children and Youth Affairs. In the role she spoke out forcefully against the Catholic Church's role in covering up child abuse. She piloted the referendum on children's rights in 2012. As a result, Article 42a was inserted into the Constitution.
She enacted the Children First legislation, to raise awareness of child abuse and neglect and to improve child protection.

Minister for Justice and Equality (2014–2017)
On 8 May 2014, Fitzgerald succeeded Alan Shatter as Minister for Justice and Equality.

Fitzgerald has spoken out in support of young families, and believes the government should take a more proactive role in helping parents and children. "I feel so strongly about the State taking a more proactive role around childcare, paternity leave and parental leave," she noted. "I do want to see us getting to the place where the State is more supportive when it comes to childcare. We have been slow enough on that."

In early 2016, when gangland activity became an issue in Dublin, Fitzgerald committed that there would be a permanent armed response unit in Dublin.

On 6 May 2016, Fitzgerald was reappointed as Minister for Justice and Equality. She was also promoted to the position of Tánaiste (Deputy Prime Minister), by Taoiseach Enda Kenny.

After the 2017 Fine Gael leadership election, brought about by Enda Kenny's resignation as party leader, Fitzgerald 'seriously considered' putting her name down as a candidate for leader but ultimately decided against it.

After Leo Varadkar was elected Leader of Fine Gael, and by extension Taoiseach-designate, he was asked whether he would make his rival Simon Coveney Tánaiste. He confirmed Fitzgerald would remain as Tánaiste, saying 'we have a Tánaiste, it's Frances Fitzgerald and I think she's doing an excellent job'. Upon his appointment as Taoiseach, Varadkar retained Fitzgerald as Tánaiste, but moved her from Justice and Equality to Business, Enterprise and Innovation. Charles Flanagan replaced her as Minister of Justice and Equality.

Resignation
In November 2017, Fitzgerald was accused of interference in the case of a whistleblower, who had claimed widespread malpractice and corruption in the Garda Síochána. She denied the allegation, Leader of the Opposition, Micheál Martin threatened a vote of no confidence, jeopardising the confidence and supply between Fine Gael and Fianna Fáil. Whilst retaining support from many within her party, a number of Fine Gael deputies called on her to resign. On 28 November 2017, Fitzgerald relented, offering her resignation to the Taoiseach, which he accepted.

Fitzgerald was later cleared of blame by the Collins Report in March 2018. In October 2018, the  third interim report of the Disclosures Tribunal found that she had "selflessly" resigned in the national interest.

European Parliament 
On 4 March 2019, Fine Gael announced that Fitzgerald would be one of their two candidates for the Dublin constituency in the 2019 European Parliament election. Former SDLP leader Mark Durkan, who joined Fine Gael to contest the election, was also announced as the second candidate. She was elected as an MEP on the 14th count, with 16.23% of first preference votes.

References

External links

Frances Fitzgerald's page on the Fine Gael website
Centre For the Advancement of Women in Politics: Frances Fitzgerald

 

1950 births
Living people
Alumni of University College Dublin
Alumni of the London School of Economics
Women government ministers of the Republic of Ireland
Fine Gael TDs
Local councillors in Dublin (city)
Members of the 27th Dáil
Members of the 28th Dáil
Members of the 23rd Seanad
21st-century women members of Seanad Éireann
Members of the 31st Dáil
Members of the 32nd Dáil
20th-century women Teachtaí Dála
21st-century women Teachtaí Dála
Ministers for Justice (Ireland)
Politicians from County Limerick
Tánaistí
Fine Gael senators
Female justice ministers
MEPs for the Republic of Ireland 2019–2024
21st-century women MEPs for the Republic of Ireland
People educated at Dominican College Sion Hill
Fine Gael MEPs
Ministers for Enterprise, Trade and Employment